The Reserve Bank of Zimbabwe began to release Zimbabwean bond coins on 18 December 2014. The coins are supported by a US$50 million facility extended to the Reserve Bank of Zimbabwe by Afreximbank (the African Export–Import Bank). To date coins worth US$15 million have been struck out of the total $50 million available. The coins were first issued in denominations of 1, 5, 10, and 25 cents and are pegged to the corresponding values in U.S. dollars. A 50 cents bond coin was released in March 2015.

The coins are being issued to remedy a lack of small change resulting from the absence of a solid seigniorage contract with the U.S., South Africa or any of several other countries whose currencies, including the U.S. dollar and the euro, are being used in the multi-currency system that arose in 2009, when Zimbabwe abandoned the Zimbabwean dollar in response to several cycles of hyperinflation. The Zimbabwean economy being too frail and small to pay the interest which would come with a seigniorage contract, the country chose instead to implement a multi-currency environment based on the U.S. dollar. However, this arrangement has meant a shortage of small change in coins.

Public reaction to the bond coins has been extremely skeptical, with widespread fear that they are the government's first step to reintroducing an unreliable Zimbabwean dollar. John Mangudya, the Governor of the Reserve Bank of Zimbabwe, has denied that the Zimbabwean dollar is being reintroduced.

The bond coins, struck at the South African Mint in Pretoria, are the first Zimbabwean coins since 2003.

A bimetallic one-dollar bond coin was released on 28 November 2016 along with two- and five-dollar Zimbabwean bond notes. A bimetallic two-dollar bond coin was released in 2019, and circulates with its equivalent banknote in circulation.

Coins in Circulation

Bond coins and the RTGS dollar 
In February 2019, the RBZ Governor, announced that the bond coins would be part of the "values" that make up the new currency to be added into the Zimbabwean market, the RTGS dollar.

See also 
 Zimbabwean bond notes
 Zimbabwean bonds
 Zimbabwean dollar
 RTGS Dollar

References 

Currencies of Africa
Circulating currencies
Currencies of Zimbabwe
Dollar
Currencies introduced in 2014